Valhalloceras is a genus of nautiloid cephalopods found only in upper Lower Ordovician, Arenigian, carbonates on Svalbard Island and Jan Mayen Island. The type and only species so far named is Valhalloceras floweri Evans and King 1990.

Valhalloceras is assigned to the Oncocerida, it and the related genus Phthanoncoceras are united in the family Phthanoncoceratidae.

References

Valhalloceras floweri in Fossilworks, 16 Oct 2014
Jack Sepkoski, 2000. List of cephalopod genera

Prehistoric nautiloid genera
Ordovician cephalopods of Europe
Fossils of Svalbard